Rachel Kolly d'Alba (born 21 May 1981 in Lausanne, Switzerland) is a Swiss violinist. Considered a child prodigy at the violin, she started playing at the age of five.

Early life
Kolly d'Alba took her first violin and piano lessons at the age of five. She studied at the Lausanne Conservatory where she received, at the age of 15, her diplomas for teaching the violin and for chamber music. She continued her studies at the University for Music and Drama in Berne in the class of the Slovenian violinist and teacher Igor Ozim. In addition to her violin studies, she studied orchestration with Jean Balissat, composition with Michael Jarrell in Geneva and contemporary chamber music with Bruno Canino.

Career 

Considered one of the most successful Swiss soloists and recognized internationally, Kolly d'Alba made her debut as a soloist at the age of twelve. She has appeared recently as a soloist with orchestras such as the NHK Symphony Orchestra, the Orchestra Sinfonica di Milano Giuseppe Verdi, the Orchestre de Chambre de Lausanne, the BBC Philharmonic, the Bern Symphony Orchestra, the Orchestre national des Pays de la Loire, the RAI National Symphony Orchestra, the Real Orquesta Seville, the Berne Chamber Orchestra, the Jenaer Philharmonie, the Orchestra della Svizzera Italiana, the National Symphony Orchestra of Lithuania, the Bienne Chamber Orchestra, the Orchestre de chambre de Toulouse, the WDR Symphony Orchestra Cologne, the hr-Sinfonieorchester (Frankfurt Radio Symphony Orchestra), the Biel Symphonic Orchestra, and the Orchestre de chambre Fribourgeois, and has worked with conductors such as François-Xavier Roth, Pascal Rophé, John Axelrod, Dmitri Kitayenko, Daniel Kawka, Laurent Gendre, Kaspar Zehnder, Jean-Jacques Kantorow, Zsolt Nagy, and Marc Kissoczy among others.

Kolly d'Alba is regularly invited to play at renowned festivals such as Menuhin Festival Gstaad, Festival de Divonne, Festival Violon sur le sable in Royan, Festival Beethoven in Chicago, Internazionale Festival di Musica in Este, Contemporary Music Festival Yerevan, Festival Schleswig Holstein, Festival de Menton, Encuentros and Mozarteum at the Teatro Colón in Buenos Aires, the Chilean Sigall, International Festival of Flanders and Murten Classics.

Kolly d'Alba plays a violin by Antonio Stradivari built in 1732.
  
Kolly d'Alba has premiered many new works by such composers as Tristan Murail, Éric Gaudibert, Frederic Perreten, Valentin Villard, Fréderic Danel, Marco Attila, Katrin Frauchiger, Jonas Kocher, and Brice Catherin, among others.

In 2010 Kolly d'Alba became the first Swiss musician to record for the Warner Music Group, signing worldwide with the major label Warner Classics. Her first CD with the label, Passion Ysaÿe, presenting the six violin sonatas by composer Eugène Ysaÿe, received unanimous praise in the international press. Her next release, as soloist with conductors Jean-Jacques Kantorow and John Axelrod, entitled French Impressions, features music for violin and orchestra by Saint-Saëns, Chausson, Ravel and Ysaÿe, and was released on the same label in October 2011. French Impressions won Best Recording of the Year in the Concerto category at the prestigious International Classical Music Awards (ICMA) 2012. Kolly d'Alba won in a field of 215 nominees from classical music and recording reviews.

Kolly d'Alba's third Warner Classics release, American Serenade, features works by American composers Gershwin, Bernstein and Waxman with the Orchestre National des Pays de la Loire conducted by Axelrod. Released worldwide in October 2012, it was rated five stars in the French magazine Diapason and in the BBC magazine, received the "supersonic" award from the magazine Pizzicato, and was immediately nominated for the same ICMA award in 2013.

Season 2013/14 included concerts as a soloist with major orchestras around the world such as Rotterdam Philharmonic Orchestra, WDR Symphony Orchestra Cologne, hr-Sinfonieorchester (Frankfurt Radio Symphony Orchestra), and Bournemouth Symphony Orchestra. Kolly d'Alba debuted at the Wigmore Hall in London in 2014. Her following recording, Fin de siècle, was released in February 2015, presenting works by Chausson and Franck.
In September 2017, she was awarded the "music prize" from the Canton of Vaud (Switzerland).
Her last CD, "Lyrical Journey", was released in September 2017 and presents works by Richard Strauss and Guillaume Lekeu. It was nominated for an ICMA Award as best CD of the year 2018 in the chamber music category, receives a Supersonic Award, and 5 stars in the French Diapason Mag.

Chronology and awards 

1992 - First prize at the final of the "Swiss Young Musicians" Competition in Zürich, Switzerland
1993 - Debut as a soloist with orchestra in Johan Svendsen's Romance Op. 26
1996 - Instrument Diploma from the Lausanne Conservatory
1997 - Teaching Diploma from the Lausanne Conservatory. Paderewski Prize for the excellence of the diploma.
2000 - 1st Prize Kiefer Hablitzel Competition, Switzerland
2001 - 1st Prize Friedl Wald Competition, Switzerland
2002 - "Solistendiplom", Diploma as a soloist at the Hochschule der Künste Bern.
2003 - Creation of the ensemble Paul Klee, a contemporary music ensemble at the Zentrum Paul Klee in Bern. Intense chamber music activity, and world premieres of works in collaboration with numerous composers.
Awarded with the cultural prize from the Leenaards Foundation.
2004 - Debut in Argentina at the Teatro Colon.
2005 - 1st Prize at the International Cardona Competition, Portugal, and Prize for the best interpretation of a contemporary music piece.
2006 - Recording of a first CD "Recital - Musique Française" (Fauré, Ravel, Debussy)
2009 - Signed with the Major Warner Classics in London
2010 - First CD for Warner Classics "Passion Ysaÿe" presenting the 6 solo Sonatas by Eugène Ysaÿe. - 5 Diapasons, recommended by Strad Magazine UK and Strings Mag US.
Debut in New York. 
2011 - Release of a second CD, as a soloist with Orchestra for Warner Classics "French Impressions ».
Supersonic Award - Best CD of the Year. London debut at Wigmore Hall. 
Received a 1732 Stradivari violin.

2012 - ICMA - 2012 Winner - Best CD of the year in the concerto category for the CD "French Impressions".
Debut in Chicago. Debut in Italy as soloist with the Milan Symphony Orchestra in Karol Szymanowski's Concerto No. 1. Debut with the BBC Philharmonic in Max Bruch's "Concerto in G minor ». Asian debut with the NHK SO in Tokyo in Maurice Ravel's « Tzigane" and Ernest Chausson's « Poëme ». 
Release of her third album "American Serenade" for violin and orchestra - Bernstein, Gershwin, Waxman, with John Axelrod, conductor. New nomination for an ICMA Award 2013 - 5 Diapasons - Recommendation Gramophone Mag - IRR - Classic FM - Supersonic Award - best CD of the year from Pizzicato magazine.

2013 - First mission in Cambodia as an Ambassador for Handicap International.
Spanish debut as a soloist with the Seville Royal Orchestra and debut with the WDR.

2014 - Debut in the Netherlands with the Rotterdam Philharmonic in Johannes Brahms’ concerto. Debut with the BSO. Debut with HR Frankfurt Radio. Debut as a soloist in Finland (Concerto by Corigliano).
Masterclasses in Paraguay for underprivileged children playing recycled instruments - (Nov. 2014)

2015 - Debut in Turkey as a soloist (Ankara). Debut in Chili as a Soloist (Santiago). 
Release of her Album "Fin de siècle" with the Swiss pianist Christian Chamorel and the Spektral Quartet of Chicago - Franck & Chausson. New nomination for her CD « fin de siècle" as best recording of the year 2016 in chamber music. Masterclasses in Paraguay for underprivileged children playing on recycled instruments. Humanitarian mission for children with AIDS (South America - Lapachos Association). 
Became honorary citizen of the city of Asuncion (Paraguay) for her work with underpriviledged children, concerts, and masterclasses.

2016 - Return as a soloist with the Royal Seville Orchestra in the concerto "1001 Nights in a harem" by Fazıl Say.
Tour in Central America: Guatemala, Mexico, Costa Rica, Panama, Colombia, USA. Debut with the Nürnberg Symphony Orchestra and recording.

2017 - Awarded with the "Prix musique 2017" of the Canton of Vaud, Switzerland. 
Release of the CD "Lyrical Journey" featuring composers Guillaume Lekeu and Richard Strauss for Indésens  with pianist Christian Chamorel. New nomination for an ICMA Award 2018 as best recording of the year in the chamber music category. 5 Diapasons - Supersonic Award -

2018 - Appointed music Director of a chamber music series in Switzerland.
2020 - Release of the CD "Bach - Partitas"

Personal life and other interests

Kolly d'Alba lives in Montreux and Basel, Switzerland. Married to an Australian businessman, she has a daughter born in 2006. Her interests include writing, literature and travel.

A keen supporter of humanitarian causes, Kolly d'Alba is an Ambassador for Handicap International. In March 2012, she traveled to Cambodia for her first mission. She is an honorary citizen of the city of Asunción (Paraguay) in recognition of her work with children with AIDS, her three consecutive seasons with the orchestra of the city of Asunción, and her masterclasses for the National Sonidos de la Tierra Program.

Discography 

 2005 – Contemporary music from Switzerland and Armenia for violin and ensemble (including Vassena's violin concerto and compositions by Gaudibert, Frauchiger and others)
 2006 – French recital for violin and piano (Debussy, Fauré, Ysaÿe, Lili Boulanger, Ravel) with Atena Carte, piano (released on Artlab)
 2007 – Tournée Européenne (Concerto for violin and Choir by Nystedt, "Ave Maria") with the "Choeur des XVI" (released on Artlab)
 2010 – Passion Ysaÿe, six solo sonatas by Eugène Ysaÿe (released on Warner Classics)
 2011 – French Impressions, works for violin and orchestra by Ravel, Saint-Saëns, Chausson, Ysaÿe (released on Warner Classics)
 2012 – American Serenade, works for violin and Orchestra by Bernstein, Gershwin, Waxman, with John Axelrod (released on Warner Classics)
 2015 – Fin de siècle, works by Franck (sonata) and Chausson (Concert) with pianist Christian Chamorel and Spektral Quartet (released on Aparté)
 2017 – Lyrical Journey, works by Strauss (sonata) and Lekeu (sonata) with pianist Christian Chamorel (released on Indesens)
 2020 – Bach Partitas (released on Indesens)

References

External links 

Profile, sme musinfo (Swiss music database)
Dailymotion: Ysaÿe Sonatas

1981 births
Living people
People from Lausanne
Swiss classical violinists
Child classical musicians
People from Montreux
21st-century classical violinists
Women classical violinists